Partizán Bardejov is a Slovak football team, based in the town of Bardejov. The club was founded in 1922. The club currently plays in the 2. liga, the second tier of the Slovak football league system, hosting games at the 3,040-capacity Mestský štadión Bardejov.

History 
The first club in Bardejov was founded on 12 February 1922 as BSC Bardejov. His first president was Július Grofčík. On 18 June 1922, BSC Bardejov played its first game at their own stadium against ETVE Prešov. BSC Bardejov lost 1 – 4. Mikuláš Chavko was the first player from Bardejov, who started in the highest football level in Czechoslovakia. He played for I.ČsŠK Bratislava. Ján Chavko played for Italian side Palermo since 1947. A World cup 1962 participant Jozef Bomba played in 1964, for choice of Europe.

Clubname history 
1932 – ŠK Bardejov
1949 – Sokol OSK Bardejov
1951 – Sokol ČSSZ Bardejov
1953 – Slavoj Bardejov
1962 – TJ Partizán Bardejov
1992 – BSC JAS Bardejov
2008 – Partizán Bardejov
2019 – NFL Partizán Bardejov
2019 – Partizán Bardejov BŠK

Honours 
 Slovak Second Division  (1993–)
  Winners (1): 1993–94

Stadium 
The team plays their home games at the Mestský štadión Bardejov which opened in 1966 and holds 3,040 Partizán supporters. In 2012 Partizán Bardejov had renovated the stadium due arrangement final match of 2012 Slovnaft Cup, between FK Senica and MŠK Žilina.

Recent seasons 
Slovak League only (1993–present)

For recent transfers, see List of Slovak football transfers winter 2021–22.

Out on loan 2021–22

Current technical staff 
As of 11 July 2022

Notable players 
Had international caps for their respective countries. Players whose name is listed in bold represented their countries while playing for Partizán.
Past (and present) players who are the subjects of Wikipedia articles can be found here.

	
 Bohumil Andrejko
 Jozef Bomba
 Juraj Čobej
 Anton Flešár
 Quintón Christina
 Marek Kaščák
 Mikuláš Komanický
 Marián Kurty
 Jozef Pisár
 Emmanuel Sarki
 Anton Šoltis
 Marián Šuchančok
 Blažej Vaščák

Notable managers

 Bohumil Andrejko
 Mikuláš Komanický (1997-1998)
 Jozef Kukulský (2000-2011)
 Mikuláš Komanický (2011-2012)
 Jozef Bubenko (2013)
 Rastislav Kica (2013-2015)
 Jozef Kukulský (2015-2017)
 Ryszard Kuźma (2017-2018)
 Jozef Danko (2018)
 Roman Berta (2018-2019)
 Miroslav Jantek (2019)
 Branislav Benko (2019)
 Jozef Kukulský (2020)
 Hajrudin Nuhic (2020)
 Bobi Stojkovski (2021)
 Marián Šarmír (2021-2022)
 Jaroslav Galko (2022)
 Rastislav Kica (2022–present)

Women's team

The women's team was founded in 2012 and first played in 2012–13. In 2016–17 the team won the Slovak Women's First League. Also the Slovak Women's Cup was won in 2016, 2017 and 2019.

References

External links 

  

 
Football clubs in Slovakia
Association football clubs established in 1922
1922 establishments in Slovakia